High&Low:The Story of S.W.O.R.D. is a Japanese Action television series produced by LDH and NTV. As the first media production of the High&Low franchise, it began the franchise and introduced the basic background of the world of High&Low, serving as a prelude for the High&Low films released in 2016 and later.

The story is set in a town where five gangs of young people, Sannoh Rengokai (Hoodlum Squad), White Rascals, Oya Koukou (Oya High School), Rude Boys, and Daruma Ikka, took control of the town on their separate territory. Based on the initials of the five gangs that lead each territory, the town began to be known as the SWORD area. However, the yakuza organization Kuryu Group tried to take control of it, and it got help from newcomer groups like Mighty Warriors, who also have their own angles. The show introduced all the groups in the SWORD area and the conflict between the SWORD gangs and Kuryu Group.

The main director of High＆Low:The Story of S.W.O.R.D. is Shigeaki Kubo, while Toshimitsu Chimura, Hiroki Kubota, Yūdai Yamaguchi, Tsuyoshi Nakakuki and Takanori Tsujimoto also serve as directors for different episodes. The series's ensemble cast includes not only a large number of members of the Exile Tribe, Takanori Iwata, Akira, Sho Aoyagi, Takahiro and Hiroomi Tosaka for instances, but also actors like Kento Hayashi, Masataka Kubota, and Yuki Yamada. Season 1 began to be aired on NTV on October 22, 2015, and season 2 began to be aired on April 17, 2016. Shortly after the broadcast of its last episode, the first High&Low film, High&Low The Movie, was released.

Synopsis 
After the sudden disbanding of the legendary group Mugen, who used to control the town, 5 new groups appeared. Sannoh Rengokai (Hoodlum Squad), White Rascals, Oya Koukou (Oya High School), Rude Boys, and Daruma Ikka, took control of the town on their separate territory, and the town began to be known as the SWORD area. When they tried to protect their town from the yakuza organization Kuryu Group, their epic stories began.

Cast and characters 
See High&Low The Movie#Cast, as cast and characters in High＆Low:The Story of S.W.O.R.D. are the same with the movie version.

 Takanori Iwata as Cobra, leader of Sannoh Rengokai (Hoodlum Squad), and a member of the former legendary gang Mugen.
 Nobuyuki Suzuki as Yamato, a childhood friend of Cobra and Noboru and Sannoh Rengokai (Hoodlum Squad) 's a second man. 
 Keita Machida as Noboru, a childhood friend of Cobra and Yamato. 
 Kenjiro Yamashita as Dan, a member of Sannoh Rengokai (Hoodlum Squad) and the "D" of the small sub-unit DTC. 
 Kanta Sato as Tettsu, a member of Sannoh Rengokai (Hoodlum Squad) and the "T" of the small sub-unit DTC. 
 Taiki Sato as Chiharu, a member of Sannoh Rengokai (Hoodlum Squad) and the "C" of the small sub-unit DTC. 
 Akira as Kohaku, leader of the former legendary gang Mugen.
 Sho Aoyagi as Tsukumo, Kohaku's right arm man and the vice-leader of the former Mugen. 
 Arata Iura as Tatsuya, one of Kohaku's best friends since childhood. 
 Shuuka Fujii as Naomi, Tatsuya's sister and the owner of the diner "Itokan".
 Takahiro as Masaki Amamiya. 
 Hiroomi Tosaka as Hiroto Amamiya. 
 Keiji Kuroki as Rocky, leader of White Rascals. 
 Yuya Endo as Koo, a White Rascals member.
 Shuntarō Yanagi as Kaito, a member of White Rascals. 
 Yu Inaba as Kizzy, a member of White Rascals. 
 Yuki Yamada as Yoshiki Murayama, leader of Oya Koukou (Oya High School). 
 Gōki Maeda as Yosuke Todoroki, leader of Oya Koukou (Oya High School)'s full-time school. 
 Masataka Kubota as Smoky, leader of Rude Boys. 
 Reo Sano as Takeshi, a member of Rude Boys.
 Tasuku Nagase as Shion, a member of Rude Boys. 
 Karen Fujii as Lala, sister of Smoky.
 Kento Hayashi as Norihisa Hyuga, leader of Daruma Ikka.
 Kenchi Tachibana as Nikaido, an executive of Iemurakai of Kuryu Group. 
 Tatsuya Nakamura as Tatsumi Iemura, leader of Iemurakai of Kuryu Group, and one of Kuryu Group's nine dragons. 
 V.I as Lee, son of Chanson's boss Chang. 
 Elly as ICE, leader of Mighty Warriors. 
 Alan Shirahama as Bernie, a member of Mighty Warriors and a hacker.
 Kana Oya as Sarah, the only female member of Mighty Warriors. 
 Shintaro Akiyama as Takano, a member of Doubt. 
 Fujiko Kojima as Junko, leader of female gang Ichigo Milk.
 Kyōko Koizumi as Odake, who has a bar on Sannoh shopping street. 
 You as Hisako Asahina, Yamato's mother. 
 Kōsuke Toyohara as Saigo, the cop who is in charge of the SWORD area.

Episodes

Season 1 (2015)

Season 2 (2016)

Reception

Critical response 
Japanese online streaming service dTV introduced the drama as impressive and points out that the most appealing part of the drama is its action scenes, beautifully performed with the exercised flesh of Exile Tribe's member. They wrote that " Powerful action scenes just keep coming and coming, which makes the drama overall compelling. At first, you may complain that there are too many fights, but as your eyes get used to it, it would make you feel like you were there and even makes you cheer for them before you realize it. It's a fun feeling of being in the middle of something. Meanwhile, these action scenes also make the best use of the actors' characteristics."

dTV was also impressed by the production design of the drama, writing that "One of the most memorable scenes is the appearance of the Rude Boys, who are located in an area that makes you wonder if there are any Rude Boys in Japan. Such ruins and abandoned factory scenes also feel like they cost a lot of money and are very impressive."

References 

2015 Japanese television series debuts
Action television series
2016 Japanese television series endings
Japanese action television series
Japanese-language television shows
Nippon TV dramas